The London Borough of Harrow is one of the northern outer London boroughs: as such much of the Metropolitan Green Belt land is within the Borough boundaries. Parks and open spaces range from the large area around Harrow-on-the-Hill to the smaller gardens and recreation grounds; there are also a number of spaces taken up with golf courses. It has been suggested that Harrow is continuously losing its green space and trees.

Areas of open space include:
 Alexandra Park, South Harrow
 Bentley Priory, Stanmore: 165 acres (66ha) open space; Site of Special Scientific Interest and Local Nature Reserve
 Byron Park, Wealdstone
 Canons Park: 45 acres (18ha) 18th century parkland
 Chandos Recreational Ground, Edgware
 Grim's Dyke Open Space, Harrow Weald
 Harrow Park, Harrow on the Hill
 Harrow Weald Common, Harrow Weald
 Headstone Manor Recreation Park:  including the Museum and Headstone Manor & Bessborough Cricket Club
 Newton Park, Rayners Lane
 Pinner Memorial Park, Pinner
 Pinner Park Farm tenant dairy farmers Hall & Sons: total 
 Pinner Village Gardens, Pinner
 Roxbourne Park, Rayners Lane
 Stanmore Common: 120 acres (48ha); Local Nature Reserve 
 Stanmore Country Park: 77.5 acres (31ha); Local Nature Reserve
 Stanmore Marsh, Stanmore
 Streamside Reservation, alongside Yeading Brook, Pinner
 The Grove Open Space, Lowlands Road, Harrow
 West Harrow Recreational Ground'', West Harrow

External links
List of parks and open spaces in Harrow
Harrow entry - London Gardens Online

References